Tolcsva is a village in Borsod-Abaúj-Zemplén county, Hungary. It is the birthplace of film pioneer William Fox.

Notable residents
 Barna Buza, Hungarian politician and jurist, Minister of Agriculture (1918-1919) and Minister of Justice (1918)
 Béla Mezőssy, Hungarian politician, Secretary of Agriculture (1906-1910) and Minister of Agriculture (1917-1918)
 Margit Feldman (1929-2020), Hungarian Holocaust survivor and activist
 William Fox, Hungarian-American businessman, founder of the Fox Film Corporation and the Fox West Coast Theatres

References

External links 
 Street map 

Populated places in Borsod-Abaúj-Zemplén County